Pegasus Company (also known as P Company or P Coy) is a training and selection organisation of the British Armed Forces based at the Infantry Training Centre, Catterick, North Yorkshire. P Coy run the 'Pre-Parachute Selection' courses for Parachute Regiment recruits and regular and reserve personnel from across the UK armed forces who volunteer to serve in a parachute role within 16 Air Assault Brigade.

Background
Pre-Parachute Selection must be undertaken by all British Army candidates for parachute training who have not already undergone a strenuous form of training, such as UK Special Forces or the All Arms Commando Course.

Training at P Coy culminates in a series of eight tests undertaken over a 5-day period (starting on a Wednesday and finishing on a Tuesday, with the weekend off). For recruits directly joining the Parachute Regiment, the tests are attempted at week 21 of training, All-Arms candidates attempt the tests after two and a half weeks of build-up training.

Upon successful completion of the course, candidates participate in the Basic Parachute course which is conducted with assistance from the Parachute Training Support Unit (PTSU) on the base of RAF Brize Norton, Oxfordshire.

Eight Tests
All events are scored, except the trainasium event which is a straight pass or fail.  The total score required to pass is 45, with 10 points (maximum) being awarded for each test.

10 miler
A  march conducted as a squad over undulating terrain. Each candidate carries a   bergen backpack (not including water) and a rifle. The march is to be completed in under 1 hour 50 minutes.

Trainasium
This is the only event which is a straight pass or fail; all the other events are scored.

Log Race
Candidates wear a helmet and webbing. This is supposed to be one of the hardest events. Points are awarded for determination, aggression and leadership.

2 Mile March
Candidates have 18 minutes to complete the run.

Steeplechase
A timed  cross-country run, followed by an assault course. The steeplechase is to be completed wearing a helmet and boots.

Milling

In this event, each candidate is paired with another of 'similar weight and build', and is given 60 seconds to demonstrate 'controlled physical aggression' in a milling contest - similar to boxing, except neither winning, losing, nor skill are pre-requisites of passing. Candidates are instead scored on their determination and aggression, while blocking and dodging result in points deducted. Candidates wear head protection, gum shields and boxing gloves.

20 Mile Endurance March
A  squadded march over the Catterick or Otterburn Training Areas. Candidates carry a  bergen (not including water) and a rifle. The march must be completed in under 4 hours and 30 minutes.

Stretcher Race
No more than four candidates carry the stretcher at any given time, swapping round at regular intervals so that all candidates carry the stretcher for a certain distance.

Women

In 2020 Capt Rosie Wild RHA became the first woman to pass Pre-Parachute Selection.

In 2022 Addy Carter of 16 Medical Regiment became the first female enlisted soldier to pass Pre-Parachute Selection.

References

External links 

 

British Army training
Military parachuting training
Parachute Regiment (United Kingdom)